The canton of Bourbonne-les-Bains is an administrative division of the Haute-Marne department, northeastern France. Its borders were modified at the French canton reorganisation which came into effect in March 2015. Its seat is in Bourbonne-les-Bains.

It consists of the following communes:
 
Aigremont
Avrecourt
Bourbonne-les-Bains
Buxières-lès-Clefmont
Celles-en-Bassigny
Le Châtelet-sur-Meuse
Chauffourt
Choiseul
Clefmont
Coiffy-le-Haut
Daillecourt
Dammartin-sur-Meuse
Damrémont
Enfonvelle
Frécourt
Fresnes-sur-Apance
Is-en-Bassigny
Laneuvelle
Larivière-Arnoncourt
Lavernoy
Lavilleneuve
Marcilly-en-Bassigny
Melay
Montcharvot
Neuvelle-lès-Voisey
Noyers
Parnoy-en-Bassigny
Perrusse
Rançonnières
Rangecourt
Sarrey
Saulxures
Serqueux
Val-de-Meuse
Vicq
Voisey

References

Cantons of Haute-Marne